Moiry may refer to:

 Moiry, Ardennes, France
 Moiry, Switzerland